Madian may refer to these places:

Towns
China
Madian, Anhui (马店), in Huoqiu County, Anhui
Madian, Hebei (马店), in Anping County, Hebei
Madian, Henan (马店), in Luoning County, Henan
Madian, Shandong (麻店), in Huimin County, Shandong

India
Madian, Birbhum, in West Bengal

Neighborhoods
Madian, Beijing (马甸), in Haidian District, Beijing

See also
Midian, a place and name of a people mentioned in the Bible and Quran, believed to be in northwest Arabia